The 1957 Detroit Lions season was the franchise's 28th season in the National Football League (NFL) and their 24th as the Detroit Lions. Under first-year head coach George Wilson, the Lions won their fourth and most recent NFL title.

In the penultimate regular season game with the Cleveland Browns on December 8, hall of fame quarterback Bobby Layne was lost for the season with a broken right ankle. With backup Tobin Rote in at quarterback in the second quarter, the Lions won that game and overcame a ten-point deficit at halftime the following week to defeat the Chicago Bears 21–13, whom they had lost to three weeks earlier at home. They ended the regular season with three consecutive wins and an 8–4 record. All four losses were within the Western Conference, splitting the two games with all but the Green Bay Packers, whom they swept.

Detroit tied with the San Francisco 49ers (8–4) for the conference title, which required a tiebreaker playoff game. Played at Kezar Stadium in San Francisco on December 22, the 49ers entered the game as three point favorites. Down by twenty points in the third quarter, Detroit  rallied with a 24–0 run to win 31–27. This also marks the last time the Lions have won a playoff game away from home; they are 0-11 on the road in NFL postseason games since.

The Lions were home underdogs for next week the NFL championship game on against Cleveland. Played on December 29 at Briggs Stadium in Detroit, the Lions led 17–0 after the first quarter and won in a rout, 59–14. Through the 2021 season, the Lions have yet to win, or even return to, another NFL title game (including the Super Bowl), an absence of more than sixty years. It is the fourth-longest drought in all four major sports, and the second-longest in the NFL, behind the Arizona Cardinals (1947, when the team was still based in Chicago), although the Cardinals, unlike the Lions, have subsequently appeared in the Super Bowl.

Schedule

Regular season

 Thursday (November 28: Thanksgiving)

Playoffs

Standings

Roster

Season summary
At the "Meet the Lions" banquet on Monday, August 12, seventh-year head coach Buddy Parker surprised the audience by abruptly announcing his resignation; longtime assistant coach George Wilson was promoted the following day. Two weeks later, Parker became the head coach of the Pittsburgh Steelers.

Pre-season

Week 1: at Baltimore

The Lions opened the regular season on the road with a 34–14 loss to the Baltimore Colts on September 29. Quarterback Johnny Unitas threw four touchdown passes while the Baltimore defense held the Lions to 23 rushing yards and intercepted Bobby Layne three times. Detroit's touchdowns were scored by Howard Cassady (a short run for his first NFL touchdown) and Jerry Reichow on a 32-yard pass from backup quarterback Tobin Rote.

Week 2: at Green Bay Packers

Week 3: Los Angeles Rams

Week 4: Baltimore Colts

Playoffs vs. San Francisco

On December 22, the Lions defeated the San Francisco 49ers, 31–27, in a Western Conference playoff game. The two teams had finished the regular season tied in the standings at 8–4, which called for a tiebreaker game.

The 49ers took a 24–7 lead at halftime, as Y. A. Tittle threw three touchdown passes in the first half. A field goal early in the third quarter extended the lead to 27–7, then the Lions responded with 24 unanswered points. Detroit's touchdowns were scored by Steve Junker on a four-yard pass from Tobin Rote, two runs by Tom Tracy (1-yard and 58-yard runs), and Gene Gedman on a two-yard run.

NFL Championship Game

On December 29, the Lions defeated the Cleveland Browns 59–14 in the NFL championship game. The Browns had been favored to win by three points.  Tobin Rote, filling in at quarterback after Bobby Layne broke his ankle on December 8, was credited with "a brilliant performance" as he completed 12 of 19 passes for 280 yards and four touchdowns and rushed for a touchdown, leading the Lions to their greatest point total in history. The Lions capitalized on five interceptions and two fumble recoveries, including a 19-yard interception return for touchdown by Terry Barr, and held Cleveland star rookie Jim Brown to 69 rushing yards on 20 carries.

The longest pay of the game was a 78-yard touchdown pass from Rote to Jim Doran.  Rookie Steve Junker was the Lions' leading scorer with 12 points on touchdown receptions covering 26 and 23 yards. Jim Martin followed with 11 points on eight extra point conversions and a 31-yard field goal. The victory gave the Lions their third NFL championship in six years. It was also referred to as "the perfect revenge" for the Browns' 56–10 rout of the Lions in the title game in 1954.

References

Detroit Lions on Pro Football Reference
Detroit Lions on jt-sw.com

 

Detroit Lions
Detroit Lions seasons
National Football League championship seasons
Detroit Lions